is a Japanese football player who plays for Mito HollyHock.

Career
Mizuki Ando joined J1 League club Cerezo Osaka in 2018. He made his debut in J1 League in March 2018, featuring in two matches of AFC Champions League.

His elder brother Tsubasa is also a professional footballer currently playing for J2 League side SC Sagamihara.

Club statistics
Updated to 5 September 2018.

References

External links

Profile at J. League
Profile at Cerezo Osaka

1999 births
Living people
Association football people from Ōita Prefecture
J1 League players
J2 League players
J3 League players
Association football forwards
Japanese footballers
Cerezo Osaka players
Cerezo Osaka U-23 players
FC Machida Zelvia players
Mito HollyHock players